The Mattamuskeet, Swanquarter and Cedar Island National Wildlife Refuge Complex is an administrative organization that manages U.S. Fish and Wildlife Service wildlife refuges in eastern North Carolina. The complex includes

 Mattamuskeet National Wildlife Refuge
 Swanquarter National Wildlife Refuge
 Cedar Island National Wildlife Refuge

The complex headquarters and visitor center is in the Mattamuskeet refuge headquarters. The Swanquarter refuge is unstaffed, while Cedar Island has only a firefighter

References

External links
Mattamuskeet, Swanquarter and Cedar Island National Wildlife Refuge Complex page

National Wildlife Refuges in North Carolina
Protected areas of Hyde County, North Carolina
Protected areas of Carteret County, North Carolina
Protected areas of Washington County, North Carolina